Gornji Zemon (in older sources: Gorenji Zemon) is a village southeast of Ilirska Bistrica in the Inner Carniola region of Slovenia.

Name
The name Gornji Zemon means 'upper Zemon', distinguishing the settlement from neighboring Dolnji Zemon (literally, 'lower Zemon'). The village was attested in written records in 1498 as Obersemel. Like similar Slovene and other Slavic toponyms (e.g., Zemono, Zemun, Zemplín, etc.), the name is a deadjectival noun derived from Slavic *zemľьnъ 'earthen', referring to an earthwork fortification.

Mass grave
Gornji Zemon is the site of a mass grave from the end of the Second World War. The Krnice Mass Grave lies in a meadow in the hills south of the village. It contains the remains of 150  German soldiers from the 97th Corps that were shot at the beginning of May 1945.

Church
The local church in the settlement is dedicated to Saint Bartholomew and belongs to the Parish of Ilirska Bistrica.

References

External links
Gornji Zemon on Geopedia

Populated places in the Municipality of Ilirska Bistrica